Shawnee County (county code SN) is located in northeast Kansas, in the central United States. As of the 2020 census, the population was 178,909, making it the third-most populous county in Kansas. Its most populous city, Topeka, is the state capital and county seat. The county was one of the original 33 counties created by the first territorial legislature in 1855, and it was named for the Shawnee tribe of Native Americans.

History

Early history

For many millennia, the Great Plains of North America was inhabited by nomadic Native Americans. From the 16th century to 18th century, the Kingdom of France claimed ownership of large parts of North America. In 1762, after the French and Indian War, France secretly ceded New France to Spain, per the Treaty of Fontainebleau.

19th century
In 1802, Spain returned most of the land to France, but keeping title to about 7,500 square miles. In 1803, most of the land for modern day Kansas was acquired by the United States from France as part of the 828,000 square mile Louisiana Purchase for 2.83 cents per acre.

In 1854, the Kansas Territory was organized, then in 1861 Kansas became the 34th U.S. state. In 1855, Shawnee County was established.

Before the treaty of 1854, the Shawnee, Kansas, and Pottowatomie Indian tribes inhabited the area now known as Shawnee County. Westward expansion brought the country its first white settler in 1830 when Frederick Choteau opened a trading post on American Chief (now Mission) Creek. In 1855, Shawnee became one of the first counties established by the Kansas territorial legislature with a population of 250. General H. J. Strickler, of Tecumseh, a member of the council in 1855, and the joint committee on Counties, claimed Shawnee for the name of his county. At that time, Shawnee County borders were entirely south of the Kansas River and extended south to include Osage City and Carbondale. The legislature later desired to make Topeka the county seat and moved the borders of the county to their present locations to make Topeka centrally located in the county.

1855 also saw the first ever meeting of the Shawnee County Board of Commissioners. Tecumseh was the first county seat, and the first county courthouse was opened there in 1856. The building was 40x50 feet but was never finished. Topeka was made the county seat by popular vote in 1858, and a new courthouse was built at 4th Street and Kansas Avenue in 1867. In 1896, a new larger courthouse was constructed at 5th and Van Buren, with more than 50,000 residents then living in the county. That building remained in use until the current courthouse at 7th and Quincy opened in 1965.

Local etymologies
Concerning the origin of the names in this county, it is generally understood Shawnee County receives its name from that well known tribe of Indians.
Topeka A good place to grow potatoes (Prairie potatoes).
Wakarusa River of big weeds.
Shunganunga The race course.
Menoken A fine growth.
Half-Day Creek Named after a Pottawatomie chief.
Mission Creek Named after an old Kaw mission on its banks.
Blacksmith Creek Named after a Kaw blacksmith shop.
Soldier Creek Its banks were a favorite camping ground for soldiers passing from Fort Leavenworth to Fort Riley.

Geography
Shawnee County is in the northeastern part of Kansas, in the third tier of counties west of the Missouri River and about fifty-four miles south of Nebraska. It is bordered by Jackson County on the north, Jefferson County on the north and east, Douglas County on the east, Osage County on the south, Wabaunsee County on the west, and Pottawatomie County on the west. Its extent in either direction is not more than twenty-four miles. The second standard parallel south passes through the county's northern half.

When the county was formed in 1855, it was bounded by the Kansas River on the north, and the southern boundary was  further south. On February 23, 1860, the legislature changed the boundaries with the southern portion being granted to Osage County, and the northern boundary was moved a few miles north of the river (to the second standard parallel). The present northern line (six miles north of the second standard parallel) was established in 1868.

The Kansas River runs east across the county, just north of the center, being bordered on its north bank by the townships of Rossville, Silver Lake, Menoken, and Soldier, and on its south bank by the townships of Dover, Mission, and Tecumseh. The city of Topeka primarily lies to the south of the river. There is little or no current major river traffic, but it is used extensively for irrigation in the county. Major creeks emptying into the Kansas River include Cross, Soldier, Mission, Indian, and Shunganunga Creeks. The Wakarusa River, which, flowing east and northeast, empties into the Kansas River in the northeastern part of Douglas County. It has its sources in the township of Auburn, and waters the southern sections of Auburn, Williamsport and Monmouth—the tributary creeks flowing into it on either side forming the drainage and water system of the three townships.

The soil is a rich dark loam, varying from fifteen feet in some parts of the bottoms, to a uniform surface covering the upland prairie from one to three feet. The underlying formation is limestone. Beds of clay, are well distributed. Coal is found in detached and non-continuous beds, and is mined in a small way for local purposes in Topeka, Soldier and Menoken.

Along the western border the landscape is hilly with the Flint Hills a few miles further west in Wabaunsee County. Burnett's Mound is in the southwest part of Topeka. The highest point in Shawnee county is in Auburn (38° 53' 5 N, 95° 56' 35 W). Government and county surveys described the land as "bottom land, 31%; upland, 69%; forest 8%; prairie, 92%." Wooded areas are mainly found along rivers and creeks with no true forests. The growth consists of elm, cottonwood, black walnut, oak, sycamore, box elder, hickory and ash.

Adjacent counties
 Jackson County - north
 Jefferson County - northeast
 Douglas County - southeast
 Osage County - south
 Wabaunsee County - west
 Pottawatomie County - northwest

Township divisions
The county consists of twelve townships: Soldier, Menoken, Silver Lake, Grove, and Rossville north of the Kansas River; Tecumseh, Topeka, Mission, and Dover south of the river; and Monmouth, Williamsport, and Auburn in the southernmost tier of townships occupying the Wakarusa River valley. Being a city of the first class, the city of Topeka is independent of any townships and excluded from the census figures for the townships. It occupies over ten percent of the county's land area and ranks fourth in population among all cities in Kansas. Altogether, the county has five incorporated cities with the other four being cities of the third class: Auburn, Rossville, Silver Lake, and Willard.

Tecumseh Township was one of the two original townships formed in 1855, and it originally extended over all the county south of the Kansas River to the Wakarusa River. The other, Yocum Township, named after county commissioner William Yocum, contained the area south of the Wakarusa River. It contains the (unincorporated) towns of Tecumseh, Spencer, and Watson. The town and township were named for the famous Shawnee chief.

Topeka Township was carved out of the western portion of Tecumseh Township in 1857. Following the creation of newer townships and annexations by the city of Topeka, the size of the township has been significantly reduced. It contains the town of Pauline.

It contains the town of Berryton. Richland, which was in the township's far southeast corner, was purchased by the U.S. Army Corps of Engineers in the late 1960s as a part of the land acquired for Clinton Lake. By 1974, the town was vacated and the remaining buildings were demolished shortly afterward.

Williamsport Township, established in 1860, was named after Williamsport, Pennsylvania. It contains the towns of Wakarusa and Cullen Village and the greater portion of Forbes Field (airport).

Auburn Township,  in area, occupies the county's southwestern corner.

Dover Township was carved from northern portions of Auburn Township in 1867 and named after Dover, New Hampshire. It includes the city of Willard and the towns of Dover and Valencia.

Mission Township was formed from parts of Dover and Topeka townships in 1871. The City of Topeka has since annexed northeastern portions of the township. It contains several subdivisions and the Sherwood Lake area.

Soldier Township was organized following the change in the county's borders in 1860, and it contained all of the county north of the Kansas River until the formation of Silver Lake Township in 1868. A southern portion of the township has been annexed by the city of Topeka. It contains the town of Elmont.

Silver Lake Township was carved out of the western portion of Soldier Township after the county's northern border was moved in 1868. The formation of the surrounding townships of Rossville (1871) to the west, Menoken (1879) to the east, and Grove (1918) to the north has reduced the size of the township. It contains the city of Silver Lake, and it is named after a crescent-shaped lake near the city.

Rossville Township, occupying the county's northwestern corner, was carved out of the western part of Silver Lake Township in 1871. It includes the city of Rossville. The township and city were named for William W. Ross, the brother of Senator Edmund G. Ross.

Menoken Township,  in area, was carved out of the eastern portions of Silver Lake Township in 1879. The township's name is derived from a Native American word meaning "fine growth" or "a place for fine growing".

Grove Township is the youngest of the townships. It was carved out of the northern portion of Silver Lake Township in 1918. Very little remains of its only town, Grove.

Demographics

Shawnee County is included in the Topeka Metropolitan Statistical Area, which had an estimated population of 232,670 in 2021.

As of the census of 2000, there were 169,871 people, 68,920 households, and 44,660 families residing in the county. The county's racial makeup was 82.89% White, 9.03% Black or African American, 1.17% Native American, 0.95% Asian, 0.04% Pacific Islander, 3.20% from other races, and 2.72% from two or more races. 7.26% of the population were Hispanic or Latino of any race.

There were 68,920 households, of which 30.70% had children under the age of 18 living with them, 49.60% were married couples living together, 11.60% had a female householder with no husband present, and 35.20% were non-families. 29.80% of all households were made up of individuals, and 10.00% had someone living alone who was 65 years of age or older. The average household size was 2.39 and the average family size was 2.98.

25.30% of the county's residents were under the age of 18, 8.80% were from 18 to 24, 28.40% were from 25 to 44, 23.70% were from 45 to 64, and 13.70% were 65 years of age or older. The median age was 37 years. For every 100 females, there were 93.80 males. For every 100 females age 18 and over, there were 90.00 males.

The county's median household income was $40,988, and the median family income was $51,464. Males had a median income of $35,586 versus $26,491 for females. The county's per capita income was $20,904. About 6.30% of families and 9.60% of the population were below the poverty line, including 12.30% of those under age 18 and 7.10% of those age 65 or over.

Arts and culture

Points of interest

 Kansas State Capitol in downtown Topeka: constructed from 1866 to 1903, this building houses the Kansas Legislature.
 Kansas Children's Discovery Center in Gage Park
 Topeka Zoo in Topeka: located at Gage Park, this zoo is well known for its flock of eagles.
 Lake Shawnee in southeast Topeka offers playgrounds, a swimming beach, trails, an 18-hole golf course and campgrounds among other amenities.

Government

State
At the state level, Shawnee County has frequently voted for Democratic candidates. In fact, the county has gone Democratic in eight of the last eleven gubernatorial races since 1974.

Presidential elections

Since 1992, Shawnee County has become competitive in presidential elections with a slight Republican tilt. Bill Clinton in 1992 remained the last Democratic candidate to win Shawnee County until Joe Biden won the county in 2020.

From Bob Dole in 1996 to 2016, Republicans carried the county with a plurality, with the sole exception being George W. Bush in his 2004 reelection bid. In 2008, Republican John McCain won Shawnee County over Democrat Barack Obama by a margin of 49.05% to 48.77%, a margin of 241 votes. In 2016, Donald Trump won the county against Hillary Clinton with a margin of 48% to 45.17%, a 2.83% margin, or 2,079 votes. This changed in 2020, as Biden won Shawnee by a 2.3% margin, the first Democratic victory in the capital county in 28 years.

Laws
Shawnee County was a prohibition, or "dry", county until the Kansas Constitution was amended in 1986 and voters approved the sale of alcoholic liquor by the individual drink with a 30% food sales requirement. The food sales requirement was removed with voter approval in 1994.

The county voted "No" on the 2022 Kansas Value Them Both Amendment, an anti-abortion ballot measure, by 66% to 34%, outpacing its narrow support of Joe Biden during the 2020 presidential election.

Education

Colleges and universities
 Washburn University
 Bethel Bible College (closed)
 College of the Sisters of Bethany (closed)

Vocational/technical schools
 Washburn Institute of Technology formerly Kaw Area Technical School

Unified school districts
 Kaw Valley USD 321 - Serving Willard and Rossville.
 Mission Valley USD 330 - Serving Dover
 Jefferson West USD 340
 Seaman USD 345 - Serving Elmont and North Topeka.
 Silver Lake USD 372 - Serving Silver Lake
 Santa Fe Trail USD 434
 Auburn-Washburn USD 437 - Serving Auburn, Wakarusa, Pauline, and Western and Southwestern Topeka.
 Shawnee Heights USD 450 - Serving Tecumseh, Berryton and Eastern and Southeastern Topeka.
 Topeka USD 501 - Serving Central Topeka

Public libraries
 Topeka & Shawnee County Public Library

National protected area
 Brown v. Board of Education National Historic Site

Transportation
Interstate 70 crosses the county, as does the Kansas Turnpike. U.S. Route 75 crosses the county north to south and U.S. Route 40 and U.S. Route 24 cross the county west to east. K-4 serves part of the county from Dover in the southwest corner through Topeka, across the Kansas River and north into Jefferson County.

Forbes Field Air National Guard base and airport is south of Topeka near Pauline. The airport was served by Allegiant Air with biweekly service to Las Vegas. Other airports in the county include Philip Billard Municipal Airport in the Oakland neighborhood of Topeka.

Communities

Cities
 Auburn
 Rossville
 Silver Lake
 Topeka
 Willard‡

Unincorporated communities
†This populated place is designated a Census-Designated Place (CDP) by the United States Census Bureau.

 Berryton
 Dover
 Elmont
 Kiro
 Montara
 Pauline
 Tecumseh†
 Wakarusa†
 Watson

Ghost town
 Richland

Townships
Shawnee County is divided into 12 townships. As a city of the first class, Topeka is considered governmentally independent and is excluded from the census figures for the townships. In the following table, the population center is the city included in that township's population total.

See also
 National Register of Historic Places listings in Shawnee County, Kansas

References

Further reading

 
 
 Atlas and Plat Book of Shawnee County, Kansas; Kenyon Co; 107 pages; 1921.
 Plat Book, Directory, Survey of Shawnee County, Kansas; Kansas Farmer; 45 pages; 1913.
 Standard Atlas of Shawnee County, Kansas; Geo. A. Ogle & Co; 82 pages; 1898.
 Atlas of Shawnee County, Kansas; F.W. Beers; 41 pages; 1873.

External links

County
 
 Shawnee County - Directory of Public Officials
Maps
 Shawnee County Maps: Current, Historic, KDOT
 Kansas Highway Maps: Current, Historic, KDOT
 Kansas Railroad Maps: Current, 1996, 1915, KDOT and Kansas Historical Society

 
Kansas counties
Kansas placenames of Native American origin
1855 establishments in Kansas Territory
Topeka metropolitan area, Kansas